A Virus Knows No Morals  is a 1986 German film directed, written and produced by Rosa von Praunheim. It was one of the first feature films about AIDS worldwide.

The film also received much attention abroad and is still screened today. A Virus Knows No Morals premiered at the 1986 Berlin International Film Festival and was also shown, for example, at the International Film Festival Rotterdam in the same year.

Plot
A group of contrasting characters share one thing in common: They all have to do with the subject of AIDS. There is Rüdiger, a conservative gay man who runs a sex sauna. Christian is a devout man who sacrificially cares for his partner who has AIDS. A curious blood doctor tries to find out the origin of HIV and shares the positive test results with her patients, not without gloating. A reporter, disguised as a man, tries to spy on the gay scene. Finally, the government decides to isolate the infected people on the island of Helgoland in order to contain the epidemic, but the outcasts put up a brave fight.

Reception
"A Virus Respects No Morals, a Brechtian-like allegory set largely in a gay bath, was one of the early and more provocative attacks on the hypocrisy, ignorance, politics and economics surrounding the AIDS crisis." (Los Angeles Times) Critic Jerry Tallmer, founder of the Obie Award, wrote: "Rosa (originally Holger) von Praunheim, the brilliant, acerbic director of such breakthrough gay-revolutionist works as Silence = Death and A Virus Knows No Morals."

Notes

References 
Murray, Raymond. Images in the Dark: An Encyclopedia of Gay and Lesbian Film and Video Guide. TLA Publications, 1994,

External links

1986 films
1986 LGBT-related films
German LGBT-related films
HIV/AIDS in German films
West German films
Films directed by Rosa von Praunheim
1980s German-language films
1980s German films